Fred Kiprop Kiptum (born June 3, 1974) is a male long-distance runner from Kenya, who won the Amsterdam Marathon in 1999 in a time of 2:06:47.

Achievements

External links

1974 births
Living people
Kenyan male long-distance runners
Kenyan male marathon runners
Place of birth missing (living people)